The Left Democratic Manch, Assam is a left-wing political alliance in Assam which was formed to oppose the auction of 12 oil fields of Assam. The alliance comprises 11 parties.

Formation 
The front was founded in July 2016 to oppose the auction of twelve oil fields of Assam. The government had recently announced the privatisation of 68 oil fields of India.

The front also raises its voice against several other issues like the NRC issue against illegal immigration of Bangladeshis, Flood Problem, etc.

The LDM also demands that March 24, 1971 should be the cut-off date for inclusion of names in the updated NRC. It also seeks to stop eviction drives unless rehabilitation plans for the affected families are made and wants no evictions on religious grounds.

Members

References

2016 establishments in Assam
2021 establishments in India
Defunct political parties in Assam
Defunct political party alliances in India
Political parties disestablished in 2021
Political parties established in 2016